Monaco competed at the 2016 Summer Olympics in Rio de Janeiro, Brazil, from 5 to 21 August 2016. Since the nation's official debut in 1920, Monegasque athletes have appeared in every edition of the Summer Olympic Games throughout the modern era, except for three occasions. Monaco did not attend the 1932 Summer Olympics in Los Angeles at the period of the worldwide Great Depression, failed to register any athletes at the 1956 Summer Olympics in Melbourne, and also joined the United States-led boycott when Moscow hosted the 1980 Summer Olympics.

Monegasque Olympic Committee selected a team of three male athletes to compete each in track and field, judo, and artistic gymnastics (the nation's Olympic return after nine decades) at the Games, failing to register women for the first time since the 1984 Summer Olympics in Los Angeles. Middle-distance runner and London 2012 Olympian Brice Etès (men's 800 m) served as the nation's flag bearer and the only Monegasque athlete to lead the delegation in the opening ceremony, as both artistic gymnast Kevin Crovetto and judoka Yann Siccardi decided to prepare for their competition on the first day of the Games.

Athletics
 
Monaco has received a universality slot from IAAF to send a male athlete to the Olympics. 

Track and road events

Gymnastics

Artistic
Monaco has received an invitation from the Tripartite Commission to send a male gymnast to the Games, signifying the nation's Olympic return to the sport for the first time since 1920.

Men

Judo

Monaco has received an invitation from the Tripartite Commission to send a judoka competing in the men's extra-lightweight category (60 kg) to the Olympics.

See also
Monaco at the 2015 European Games

References

External links 
 

Olympics
2016
Nations at the 2016 Summer Olympics